Ahmadabad-e Razavi (also Romanized as Aḩmadābād-e Raẕavī; also known as Aḩmadābād and Allahābād) is a village in Eslamiyeh Rural District, in the Central District of Rafsanjan County, Kerman Province, Iran. At the 2006 census, its population was 564, in 128 families.

References 

Populated places in Rafsanjan County